Polyrhaphis turnbowi is a species of beetle in the family Cerambycidae. It was described by Hovore and McCarty in 1998. It is known to be found in Panama.

References

Polyrhaphidini
Beetles described in 1998